

Buildings and structures

Buildings
 1410
 In Prague, at the Old Town Hall, the Astronomical Clock (Orloj) is built.
 In Heidelberg, Germany: the Heiliggeistkirche is begun, but the nave takes until 1441 to complete.
 In Kościan (Poland), the monastery and Mary Magdalene and St Nicolas church are built, with the consent of the King of Poland Władysław Jagiełło.

 1411
 In England, construction of the Guildhall, London, is begun.
 In the Electorate of Saxony, the church of St. Moritz, Halle, is consecrated.
 1412 – At Seoul in the Korean kingdom of Joseon, the original Changdeokgung palace is completed.
 1413 – In Dubingiai (Lithuania), a new masonry castle by Vytautas the Great is built.
 1418 – Brunelleschi and Ghiberti submit plans for the dome of Florence Cathedral.
 1419
 Brunelleschi designs the loggia of the Ospedale degli Innocenti in Florence.
 The Jiqinglou Fujian tulou in Ming dynasty China is built.

Births

Deaths
 1411 – Jacques Coene, Flemish painter, illustrator and architect

Architecture